Tahu sumedang or Tahu bunkeng (Sumedangite tofu, bunkeng tofu) is a Sundanese deep-fried tofu from Sumedang, West Java, Indonesia. It was first made by a Chinese Indonesian named Ong Kino. It has some different characteristic from other tofu.

History
Tahu Bunkeng is one of the oldest tofu stores in the city of Sumedang. In 1917, the authentic "Bunkeng" tofu was first made by a Chinese immigrant by the name of Ong Kino made the first tofu in Sumedang. Ong Kino came from Anxi County, Quanzhou City, Hokkian Province, China, in the early 20th century. Ong Kino started making tofu for the consumption of his family members, but afterwards he started to sell the tofu to his neighbours. Increasingly, more people came to like the tofu and a business was established due to this. In 1917, Ong Kino's only son, Ong Bunkeng, came to Sumedang and inherited his parents' business; Ong Kino and his wife decided to return to their hometown in China. After returning to China, he bequeathed his business to his son, Ong Boen Keng (Chinese:王文卿). From 1970 until 1980 the business advanced. In 1992, the business achieved the highest success and is still very successful to this day. Now the business is taken over by Ong Yu Kim and is almost taken over again by Ong  Tjiang.

When Prince Soeriatmadja of Sumedang was on a journey to Situraja subdistrict, he stopped by "Tahu Bunkeng" to taste the tofu. He made a remark in Sundanese: "Geuning ngeunah ieu kadaharan teh, moal burung payu geura" (roughly translated as "This tastes so delicious, many people will surely buy it").

Tahu Bunkeng outlet is located in Sumedang city centre on Jalan 11 April No. 53, Tegalkalong. There are several branches in the city on Jalan M. Abdurahman No. 50, Jalan M. Abdurahnam No. 155, and Jalan Prabu Gajah Agung.

Characteristic
Tahu sumedang characteristics are its content half empty or completely empty. It has a creamier inside than the normal white tofu. The taste is savory. It is best served with lontong, various kinds of sambal, soy sauce or cabe rawit. Eko Hendrawan Sofyan of Kompas said that the size of tahu sumedang is about 2.5–3 cm x 3 cm. He also described that tahu sumedang is light brown, mottled shell, crunchy, and tasty.

See also

 Tahu goreng
 List of tofu dishes
 List of deep fried foods

References

Bibliography
 
 
 
 

Indonesian Chinese cuisine
Sundanese cuisine
Tofu dishes
Vegetarian dishes of Indonesia
Street food in Indonesia